Take No L'z is the debut studio album by Canadian rapper Puffy L'z. It was released on July 19, 2019 and received a 6/10 rating from Exclaim!.

Background
Puffy L'z returned to music in early 2019. On his return he has released the single Front Gate featuring British rapper Giggs. He released his debut studio album Take No L'z on July 19, 2019 featured guest appearances from Safe, Jay Whiss, Giggs and Smoke Dawg. He also went on to feature on Jay Whiss's debut album Peace of Mind with the single "Valet" produced by Murda Beatz released on December 4, 2019.

Track listing
Track listing adapted from KKBox.
 Take No L'z 02:33	
 Boring (Featuring Smoke Dawg & Jay Whiss) 03:49	
 This Is For 02:32	
 Do For Clout (Skit) 01:44	
 Front Gate (Featuring Giggs 02:58	
 Best of Me 02:36	
 PLL 03:12	
 Big Timer (Featuring SAFE) 03:42	
 Abti Jama (Skit) 01:56	
 Hey Mama 02:34	
 Hard Times 03:34	
 Letter To My Akhs 03:31	
 Regent State of Mind 02:10

References

2019 debut albums
Hip hop albums by Canadian artists